The Missão Centenário was born of an agreement between the Brazilian Space Agency (AEB) and the Roscosmos on October 18, 2005. The main objective of this treaty would be to send the first Brazilian into space, Lt. Col. Aviator Marcos Pontes.

The name of the mission is a reference to the commemoration of the centenary of the first crewed flight of a Brazilian-designed aircraft, the Santos-Dumont 14-bis, in Paris on October 23, 1906.

The vehicle used for launching the mission was the Roscosmos Soyuz TMA-8 spacecraft, and its launch took place on March 30, 2006 (11:30 p.m Brasília time) at the Baikonur Cosmodrome (Kazakhstan) to International Space Station (ISS).

Bilateral agreement for the mission 

The Missão Centenário was made possible by an commercial agreement signed in October 2005 between Brazil and Russia, with representatives of the Brazilian Space Agency (AEB) and Roscosmos.

As a result, astronaut Marcos Cesar Pontes began training in Star City, a training center for cosmonauts near Moscow.

Launch 
The Soyuz TMA-8 spacecraft carrying Lieutenant Colonel Marcos Pontes was launched at 11:30 p.m. on March 30, 2006 (Brasília time, 8:30 p.m. in the morning of April 1, 2006 in Kazakhstan time) . Besides the Brazilian astronaut, the crew were the Russian Pavel Vinogradov and the American Jeffrey Williams, these two members of Expedition 13.

When Pavel Vinagrodov hooked up the cabin video camera to Marcos Pontes during the launch, the Brazilian did not know what to say. He thought of waving, but that did not express what he felt, then he pointed to the flag and then up, meaning that they were all together, but he thought "wait a moment, pointing with one finger does not give the impression of 'together'!". So he pointed with two, as you can see in the video of the mission. The spacecraft docked with the International Space Station (ISS) in the early hours of Saturday, April 1.

Prior to entry to the International Space Station, the international protocol included the following order: Pavel, Jeff and Marcos. But when Pavel noticed Marcos with the Brazilian flag in his hands, he told him to come in first. Marcos replied that they might have problems. To this, the Russian replied that it would not be Marcos who would be entering the front, but a whole nation, and neither he nor Jeff would have the right to enter before a nation.

Experiments
Lt. Col. Marcos Pontes carried out eight scientific experiments at ISS, so that their behavior in a microgravity environment could be analyzed. Here are the experiments performed:

The educational experiments from the list above were accompanied by students from schools in São José dos Campos through the Internet, while conducting the same experiments on ground.

Interviews
During his stay at ISS, Marcos Pontes conducted some interviews by video-conference.

On April 3, 2006, an interview was broadcast in honour of Santos Dumont, in which Marcos Pontes used a Panama hat like the inventor and a handkerchief with the acronym "SD".

Return

The Soyuz TMA-7 brought in the night of April 8, 2006, Brasilia time, the Ten. Col. Marcos Pontes and two other astronauts from Expedition 12 (Russian Valery Tokarev and American William McArthur) who were already on the ISS. The landing point was in Kazakhstan.

For the rescue, 17 Russian MI-8 helicopters were used, and the area of the landing was around the city Arclalic, within a radius of 60 to 80 km away from it.

After the return, the three astronauts underwent a period of readaptation to gravity.

Total duration of the mission 
Marcos Pontes performed 155 orbits and the total duration of his mission was 9 days, 21 hours and 17 minutes.

Patch
The patch of the Missão Centenário was produced jointly by Secom, MCT and AEB.

Commemorative acts 
As a celebration for this mission that was the first to bring a Brazilian astronaut into space, as well as being a tribute to the centenary of the first flight of an aircraft heavier than the air of Santos Dumont in Europe, stamps and a medal were released.

Criticism 
The mission was criticized by part the Brazilian scientific community, such as the Sociedade Brasileira para o Progresso da Ciência (SBPC), according to which the money invested in the mission should be used to train staff as well as investing in other types of scientific research. In addition, they report the non-compliance of the Brazilian participation in the construction of the ISS. Other critics denounced the political use and crossed out the trip as space tourism.

The Brazilian Space Agency and Marcos Pontes rebuffed these criticisms, saying that the space program has never had so much visibility in the press, which would make it possible in the future to allocate more funds for space exploration. In addition, the mission may encourage children to study and pursue a scientific career.

Gallery

See also
 Brazilian Space Agency
 Marcos Pontes

References

External links

 
 

2005 in Brazil
2006 in Brazil
2005 in Russia
2006 in Russia
Space program of Brazil
2006 in spaceflight
Astronautics
Alberto Santos-Dumont
International Space Station